Ann Hunter Popkin (born 1945) is a long-time social justice and women's movement activist. As a northern college student she traveled to Mississippi to participate in  Freedom Summer in 1964. She was a founding member of Bread and Roses, a women's liberation organization in Cambridge, Massachusetts, in 1969, and produced the first scholarly study of its appeal and impact. A photographer, film-maker, teacher,  and counselor, Popkin has worked in a variety of university and community settings.

Popkin graduated from Radcliffe College in 1967 and also attended Brandeis University from 1968 to 1977 where she earned a Ph.D. in Sociology.

Early Movement Activism 
Working alongside northern and southern black and white students doing voter registration canvassing and community work in Vicksburg, Mississippi in the summer of 1964 was a powerful experience that shaped Popkin's life-long commitment to social justice and anti-racism. She participated in the anti-war movement,  working  in 1967 as a researcher for Professor Noam Chomsky analyzing American press coverage of the Vietnam War. In 1969, she joined other women who began to expand the analysis of race and class inequality  to challenge widely accepted ideas about gender inequality and to envision women's liberation. As a founding member of Bread and Roses, Popkin took part in its various collective  activities, including participating in consciousness raising as well as  protests exposing  and criticizing sexism, and marching as part of women's contingents at anti-war and civil rights protests and demonstrations. Into the mid 1970s, Being part of women's liberation was another formative and continuing influence on Popkin's life and work. She  taught courses on the women's movement at a Boston-area Women's School, and was also active in the New England Marxist-Feminist Study Group and the Boston Women's Union.

University and Community Teaching and Anti-Racist Work 
Starting in 1973, Popkin taught courses on the  Sociology of Men and Women, Social Movements,  Media and Society, and Unlearning Racism and Sexism at  the University of Massachusetts at Boston, the University of California at Santa Cruz,  the University of Oregon, where she was the acting director of women's studies, and at Oregon State, where she was the Acting Director of the Differences, Power and Discrimination Program. In 2003 Popkin received a Women of Achievement Award from Oregon State. Beginning in 1983, Popkin also served as a leader and facilitator for community-based Unlearning  Racism and Sexism Workshops in the Bay Area, California and in Eugene, Oregon. She currently leads Compassionate Listening Training and Practice Groups in Portland, Oregon.

Scholarship and Publications  
 Ann Hunter Popkin, "Bread and Roses: An Early Moment in the Development of Socialist-Feminism," PhD Dissertation in Sociology, Brandeis University, 1978
 Linda Gordon and Ann Popkin, "Women's Liberation: Let Us All Now Emulate Each Other," in Seasons of Rebellion: Protest and Radicalism in Recent America, ed. Joseph Boskin and Robert Rosenstone (NY: Holt, Rinehart and Winston, 1972) pp. 286–312.
 Ann Popkin, "The Personal is Political: The Women's Liberation Movement," in They Should Have Served That Cup of Coffee, ed. Dick Cluster (Boston: South End Press, 1979), pp. 181–222
 Ann Popkin, "An Early Moment in Women's Liberation," Radical America, Vol. 22, No. 1, January–February, 1988
 Ann Popkin, "The Social Experience of Bread and Roses: Building a Community and Creating a Culture," in Women, Class and the Feminist Imagination, ed Karen V. Hansen and Ilene J. Philipson (Philadelphia: Temple University Press, 1990)
 Ann Popkin and Susan Shaw, "Teaching Teachers to Transgress," Teaching for Change: The Difference, Power and Discrimination Model, ed. Jun Xing, Judith Li, Larry Roper, and Susan Shaw (CA Lexington Press, 2007), pp. 66–110

Photography and Film 
Ann Popkin's photographs have been published in various editions of Our Bodies, Ourselves between 1972 and 1998, Ourselves and Our Children, 1978, and in the Boston Globe Sunday magazine, 1973.

Her documentary films include "Grandma," the life of an older woman as working wife and mother, 16mm, black and white, and Charm School, one aspect of female socialization, Super 8mm, color.

References

External links
Papers of Ann Hunter Popkin, 1968-1977: A Finding Aid. Schlesinger Library, Radcliffe Institute, Harvard University.
Papers of Judith Elwyn Popkin, Schlesinger Library, http://id.lib.harvard.edu/aleph/013715134/catalog
Elizabeth Sutherland, ed. Letters from Mississippi (NY: McGraw Hill, 1965)  includes letters written by Ann Popkin;  http://zinnedproject.org/materials/letters-from-mississippi/
"Oral History of the Sixties: the Local Perspective, Boston, Massachusetts," a videotape presentation by Annie Popkin about Bread and Roses in 1969 to 1971 to the Oral History Association Annual Meeting, Long Beach (CA) Conference, Fall 1986. https://www.youtube.com/watch?v=_aZRHPfo7eU

1945 births
Living people
American women's rights activists
Radcliffe College alumni
Brandeis University alumni
University of Oregon faculty